The Court House Hill–Downtown Historic District is a national historic district located in Lynchburg, Virginia. The area is situated on a promontory overlooking the Lower Basin Historic District on the south bank of the James River. The approximately  district is composed of relatively intact city blocks of religious, commercial, residential, and governmental buildings and structures ranging in date from the early 19th century to the mid-20th century. Buildings in the district represent a variety of styles from the different periods, including the Federal, Greek Revival, Gothic Revival, Italianate, Queen Anne, Neoclassical, Italian Renaissance, Spanish Eclectic, Craftsman, and Art Deco styles.

It was listed on the National Register of Historic Places in 2001 and expanded in 2002 to also include the area between Madison and Harrison Streets and 5th and 7th Streets.

Some of the more notable contributing resources to this historic district include:
 Allied Arts Building (also listed separately on the National Register of Historic Places)
 Carter Glass House (also listed separately on the National Register of Historic Places)
 First Baptist Church (also listed separately on the National Register of Historic Places)
 Holy Cross Catholic Church
 Lynchburg Courthouse (also listed separately on the National Register of Historic Places)
 Lynchburg Furniture Company
 Monument Terrace
 St. Paul's Church (also listed separately on the National Register of Historic Places)
 John Marshall Warwick House (also listed separately on the National Register of Historic Places)
 Dicks-Elliott House

Gallery

References

Historic districts in Lynchburg, Virginia
Buildings and structures in Lynchburg, Virginia
National Register of Historic Places in Lynchburg, Virginia
Historic districts on the National Register of Historic Places in Virginia